Czech Cricket Union (Czech: Českomoravský Kriketový Svaz,  ČMKS) is the official governing body of the sport of cricket in Czech Republic. Its current headquarters is in Prague, Czech Republic. Czech Cricket Union is the Czech Republic's representative at the International Cricket Council and is an associate member and has been a member of that body since 2000. It is also a member of the European Cricket Council.

History
The first cricket match in the Czech Republic was played in 1997, and the ČMKS was set up in 2000 to drive forward the development of the game. The ČMKS runs Domestic leagues and  operates a cricket-dedicated facility at the Vinoř Cricket Ground, with two fields, which has been in operation since 2012. 

Their Development partner, KAČR, delivers introduction to cricket programmes in Czech schools, runs soft ball and hard ball clubs and tournaments at U10, U12, U14 and U16 level for Boys and girls.

Administration 
The Česko Moravský Kriketový Svaz is a member based organisation, clubs that join the association become members with full voting rights. The operations of the ČMKS are carried out by the Chief Executive Officer who is responsible for implementing the mission of the  ČMKS and its strategic plan. The mission of the  ČMKS is set out in its constitution while the strategic plan is decided by the Executive Committee, which is elected by the member clubs. The current committee is:

President - Prakash Sadasivan
Chairman  - Sujith Gopalakrishnan 
Secretary - Somesekhar Banerjee
Treasurer - Harsha Chaganty
Marketing Officer - Shyamal Joshi
Development Officer - Pratap Jagtap
National team manager - Sudhir Gladson
Women's Officer - Desika Moodley
Chief Executive Officer - On December 16 2020 it was announced that Terry O'Connor had been appointed the first ever CEO of the Czech Cricket Union.

Leagues and Cups 
Pro40 league - 12 Teams in 2 Divisions

T20 league - 18 teams in 3 Divisions

T10 league - 10 Teams in 1 Division

Indoor League - 18 teams in 3 Divisions

Scott Page Cup - Annual charity game

Clubs and Associated Members
 Bohemian Cricket Club
 Brno Cricket Club
Budějovice Barracudas CC
 Kriketová Akademie ČR z.s. (KAČR)
Moravian Cricket Club
Olomouc Cricket Club
 Prague Barbarians Cricket Club
Prague Tigers Cricket Club
Prague Spartans Cricket Club
 Prague Cricket Club
 United Cricket Club
 Vinohrady Cricket Club

Men's national Cricket Team 
Czech Republic national cricket team

References

 Czech Cricket official website
 Play-cricket.com stats database for Czech National Team games, official and unofficial

External links
 Czech Cricket official website
 Play-cricket.com stats database for Czech National Team games, official and unofficial

Cricket administration
Sports governing bodies in the Czech Republic
Sports organizations established in 2000